The 2019–20 Russian Football National League was the 28th season of Russia's second-tier football league since the dissolution of the Soviet Union. The season began on 7 July 2019 and ended on 15 May 2020 (last games were played on 15 March).

Summary 
On 17 March 2020, the league was suspended until 10 April 2020 due to the COVID-19 pandemic in Russia. On 1 April 2020, Russian Football Union extended the suspension until 31 May 2020.

On 15 April 2020, FC Armavir dropped out of the competition due to lack of financing necessary to acquire the license for the 2020–21 season. The club was in the 12th place in the table with 30 points acquired in 27 games. Even though the league was suspended at that time due to COVID-19 pandemic in Russia, FNL president Igor Yefremov stated that the drop-out was not directly related to that and the club was in financial trouble before the pandemic. According to the league regulations, all Armavir's opponents in the second half of the season were to automatically assigned a 3–0 victory in all of their second games against Armavir, including retroactively in the games that were already played. As a result, FC Fakel Voronezh, FC Torpedo Moscow and FC Spartak-2 Moscow (who lost to Armavir in their second games of the season) were expected to gain 3 extra points and FC Tom Tomsk (who tied with Armavir) were expected to gain 2 extra points.

On 30 April 2020, the clubs voted unanimously that the league can not be concluded by 2 August 2020 as planned. The teams that were in positions from 3 to 5 (FC Chertanovo Moscow, FC Torpedo Moscow and FC Neftekhimik Nizhnekamsk) suggested extending the season past that date (the 3rd and 4th placed teams were expected to play in Russian Premier League relegation/promotion playoffs), but were overruled by the other 17 clubs. The decision was complicated by FC Armavir announcing that the club is dropping out of the competition but not officially filing related paperwork with the league. If they formally dropped out, FC Torpedo Moscow would have gained 3 points in the game they already played and lost to Armavir, and would have advanced into the 2nd position in the table that secures direct promotion into the Premier League.

On 15 May 2020, the league was abandoned, and the top two teams (FC Rotor Volgograd and FC Khimki) were promoted, pending licensing for the Premier League for 2020–21 season. None of the teams were relegated to PFL and all the winners of the PFL zones were promoted to the FNL as well for the 2020–21 season, all conditional on passing FNL licensing.

Team changes

To FNL
Promoted from PFL
 Chayka Peschanokopskoye
 Neftekhimik Nizhnekamsk
 Torpedo Moscow
 Tekstilshchik Ivanovo

Relegated from Premier League
 Yenisey Krasnoyarsk

From FNL
Relegated to PFL
 Sibir Novosibirsk
 Zenit-2 Saint Petersburg
 Tyumen

Promoted to Premier League
 Tambov
 Sochi

FC Anzhi Makhachkala
On May 29, 2019, Anzhi, which was relegated to FNL at the end of the 2018–19 Russian Premier League season, recalled their appeal to the Russian Football Union on earlier RFU's decision to deny them the FNL license. Therefore, Anzhi did not play in the FNL in the 2019–20 season. Anzhi then passed the licensing procedure of the RFU, which allows them to participate in the PFL.

Stadia by capacity

Stadia by locations

League table

Results

Statistics

Top goalscorers

References

2019–20 in Russian football leagues
Russian First League seasons
Russian
Russia